Mu Epsilon Delta , also known as MED, is a national fraternity for those who are interested in or currently studying in the pre-medical field. It was founded in 1965 on the campus of the University of Tennessee at Martin. The co-ed fraternity is a service organization and is recognized as such. It functions as a non-profit, national health science, honor, and service pre-professional organization and operates for the benefit of its members. This organization is intended to provide information about the medical field and to promote campus interest in the medical professions.

Purpose
The purpose of this fraternity is to promote scholarship of the pre-medical professions in the community. Mu Epsilon Delta shall participate in community related events. By being positive influences upon the university and community Mu Epsilon Delta will be able to provide insight and exposure for its members to doctors. Mu Epsilon Delta should assist pre-medical professional students and promote academic success as well as providing a forum for exchanging ideas and concerns.

Symbols

Colors
The colors of Mu Epsilon Delta are red, white, and blue. Red represents the action, passion, confidence of the members of Mu Epsilon Delta to pursue dreams. White represents the clarity and focus of the members of Mu Epsilon Delta. Blue symbolizes the close-mindedness of Mu Epsilon Delta and the broadening perspectives of its members in learning new information.

Symbol
The symbol of Mu Epsilon Delta is the Caduceus, which features two snakes on a winged staff. Tracing its lineage back to Greek Mythology the Caduceus is most commonly associated with Hermes, the "messenger of the gods". The similarity of the Caduceus to the unnamed staff of Asclepius, the Greco-Roman god of medicine  is what largely led to its wide use as the symbol of physicians, the US Army Medical Corps, and pre-professional fraternities such as Mu Epsilon Delta.

Flower
Red Rambling Rose

Motto
"With purity and passion I pass my life and practice my art."

Chapters
The fraternity has installed six collegiate chapters:  
 University of Tennessee at Martin
 Lipscomb University
 University of Tulsa
 University of Kansas
 Grand Valley State University
 University of Michigan

References 

 Mu Epsilon Delta
 MEDNGCSU

External links
 University of Tennessee at Martin MED
 Mu Epsilon Delta at The University of Michigan
 Mu Epsilon Delta Grand Valley State University
 Mu Epsilon Delta University of Kansas
 North Georgia College & State University

University of Tennessee at Martin
Professional medical fraternities and sororities in the United States
1965 establishments in Tennessee
Medical and health organizations based in Tennessee
Student societies in the United States
University of Kansas
Organizations based in Kansas
Student organizations established in 1965